C. coccinea  may refer to:
 Canna coccinea, a plant species native of northern Argentina
 Crataegus coccinea, the scarlet hawthorn, a plant species

Synonyms
 Cattleya coccinea, a synonym for Sophronitis coccinea, an orchid species occurring from Brazil to Argentina

See also
 Coccinea (disambiguation)